Benny Govaerts is a Paralympian athlete from Belgium competing mainly in category T37 middle-distance events.

Biography
Bbenny has competed in 5 Paralympics and won 4 gold, 1 silver and 2 bronze medals, making him one of the most successful Belgian Paralympians..  in his first games in 1988 he won three gold medals in the C7 class 800m, 1500m and 5000m cross country. He added a further gold medal in 1992 in the 5000m.  1996 games were the first that Benny did not win a gold medal at winning only a bronze medal in the 5000m.  Things improved in 2000 when he won a silver in the 5000m and a bronze in the 1500m only for the 2004 Summer Paralympics to yield no medals.

External links
 profile on paralympic.org

Paralympic athletes of Belgium
Athletes (track and field) at the 1988 Summer Paralympics
Athletes (track and field) at the 1992 Summer Paralympics
Athletes (track and field) at the 1996 Summer Paralympics
Athletes (track and field) at the 2000 Summer Paralympics
Paralympic gold medalists for Belgium
Paralympic silver medalists for Belgium
Paralympic bronze medalists for Belgium
Living people
Medalists at the 1988 Summer Paralympics
Medalists at the 1992 Summer Paralympics
Medalists at the 1996 Summer Paralympics
Medalists at the 2000 Summer Paralympics
Year of birth missing (living people)
Paralympic medalists in athletics (track and field)
Belgian male middle-distance runners